The rougarou (alternatively spelled as roux-ga-roux, rugaroo, or rugaru) is a legendary creature in French communities linked to traditional concepts of the werewolf.

Versions
The stories of the creature known as a rougarou are as diverse as the spelling of its name, though they are all connected to francophone cultures through a common derived belief in the loup-garou. Loup is French for wolf, and garou (from Frankish warulf, cognate with English werewolf) is a man who transforms into an animal.

American folklore

"Rougarou" represents a variant pronunciation and spelling of the original French loup-garou. According to Barry Jean Ancelet, an academic expert on Cajun folklore and professor at the University of Louisiana at Lafayette in America, the tale of the rougarou is a common legend across French Louisiana. Both words are used interchangeably in southern Louisiana. Some people call the monster rougarou; others refer to it as the loup-garou.

The rougarou legend has been spread for many generations, either directly from French settlers to Louisiana (New France) or via the French Canadian immigrants centuries ago.

In the Cajun legends, the creature is said to prowl the swamps around Acadiana and Greater New Orleans, and the sugar cane fields and woodlands of the regions. The rougarou most often is described as a creature with a human body and the head of a wolf or dog, similar to the werewolf legend.

Often the story-telling has been used to inspire fear and obedience. One such example is stories that have been told by elders to persuade Cajun children to behave. According to another variation, the wolf-like beast will hunt down and kill Catholics who do not follow the rules of Lent. This coincides with the French Catholic loup-garou stories, according to which the method for turning into a werewolf is to break Lent seven years in a row.

A common blood sucking legend says that the rougarou is under the spell for 101 days. After that time, the curse is transferred from person to person when the rougarou draws another human's blood. During that day the creature returns to human form. Although acting sickly, the human refrains from telling others of the situation for fear of being killed.

Other stories range from the rougarou as a rabbit to the rougarou being derived from witchcraft. In the latter claim, only a witch can make a rougarou—either by turning into a wolf herself, or by cursing others with lycanthropy.

In popular culture

The "rugaru" is mentioned as having come to Dakota consciousness from Ojibwa folktales, and figures both thematically and experientially in the narrative of Peter Mathiessen's In The Spirit of Crazy Horse (Viking, 1983).

The NBA team formerly known as the New Orleans Hornets filed for several new name trademarks among which was the Rougarous.

The creature is featured in an episode of Cajun Justice, an AE Television show. A camp owner alerted authorities and video taped what he suspected to be a Rougarou in the weeds behind his camp.

The legend of the rougarou plays a prominent role in the History Channel television series Cryptid: The Swamp Beast. An unknown creature has been mutilating and killing animals and perhaps humans in southern Louisiana; some locals attribute the attacks to a rougarou. Similarly, in episode 6 of Swamp Mysteries, Troy Landry discusses the rougarou legend while hunting a creature killing pets at Voodoo Bayou.

The novel Hagridden by Samuel Snoek-Brown features heavy usage of the Cajun version of the rougarou.

In late 2014, Cedar Point theme park in Sandusky, Ohio announced plans to renovate the existing Mantis roller coaster into "Rougarou" for the 2015 season.

The 2015 short film Atchafalaya centers around a game warden searching in a Louisiana swamp for a missing person who is hinted to have been taken by a loup-garou. The creature is only vaguely seen in the film with a head resembling a bear.

Boxer Regis Prograis (of Creole descent) goes by the nickname Rougarou.

J. K. Rowling's Harry Potter universe includes wands that contain rougarou hair as their magical core.

A “rugaru” is the monster of the week in Season 4, Episode 4 of Supernatural.

The rougarou is incorporated into the story of an episode of the American television show NCIS: New Orleans. In the episode a victim is killed while investigating a possible sighting of the rougarou, which occurs in the 20th episode of the sixth season.

The novel Empire of Wild (2019; Penguin Random House Canada) by Cherie Dimaline is "inspired by the traditional Métis story of the Rogarou—a werewolf-like creature that haunts the roads and woods of Métis communities."

The comic series Wilde Life by Pascalle Lepas features a Rougarou as an antagonist in Chapter Five: Monster.

The show Shadow of the Rougarou (2022, APTN lumi, AppleTV+), by Métis director Jordan Waunch, was created with the guidance of Elders and Knowledge Keepers in order to best represent the communal oral story.

See also
Loogaroo

Footnotes

American legendary creatures
Werewolves
Cajun culture
Canadian legendary creatures 
Culture of Quebec